Stuart Murdoch may refer to:

Stuart Murdoch (musician), lead singer of Belle & Sebastian
Stuart Murdoch (football manager), former footballer and ex-manager of Wimbledon F.C.

See also
Stewart Murdoch (born 1990), Scottish footballer

fr:Stuart Murdoch